Pomposa Abbey is a Benedictine monastery in the comune of Codigoro on the Adriatic coast near Ferrara, Italy. It was one of the most important in northern Italy, famous for the Carolingian manuscripts preserved in its rich library, one of the wealthiest of Carolingian repositories,<ref>G. Mercati, Il Catalogo della biblioteca di Pomposa, 1896;  M. Inguanez, "Inventario di Pomposa del 1459", Bollettino del bibliofilo (the 1459 inventory in the archives of Monte Cassino); Guido Billanovich, "'Veterum Vestigia Vatum' nei carmi dei preumanisti padovani", Italia medioevale e umanistica, I (1958:161-64); Billanovich, La biblioteca di Pomposa: Pomposia monasterium modo in Italia primum, 1994.</ref> and for the Romanesque buildings.

History
The earliest report of a Benedictine abbey at this site dates from 874, by which time Pomposa was already a center of sophisticated Carolingian art The settlement was probably two centuries earlier, founded at some point following the devastation of Classe, the port of Ravenna (574) during the Lombard epoch of northern Italy by monks of the Irish missionary, Columbanus. A letter of c. 1093 mentions among classical texts acquired or copied for the library by the abbot Girolamo alludes to Horace (Carmen Saeculare, Satires, Epistles), Virgil's Georgics, Juvenal, Persius, Quintilian, Terence's Andria, Jerome's preface to the history of Eusebius, Cicero's De officiis and De oratore, the abridgement of Livy called Periochae and the Mathematica of Julius Firmicus Maternus.

Until the 14th century the abbey had possessions in the whole of Italy, making its cartulary of more than local importance, but later declined due to impoverishment of the neighbouring area owing to the retreat of the sea front and the increasing presence of malaria of the lower Po valley. It played an important role in the culture of Italy thanks to the work of its scribe monks and in part to the sojourn at Pomposa of Peter Damian. In this abbey Guido d'Arezzo invented the modern musical notation in the early 11th century.

The monks of Pomposa migrated to San Benedetto, Ferrara, 1650, leaving the abbey unoccupied. In the 19th century the abbey was acquired by the Italian government.

The church of Santa Maria is an example of a triple-nave Ravennan Romanesque-style basilica with arcaded aisles and carpentry rafters, originating in the 7th-9th century, and sequentially enlarged as the abbey grew in power and prestige, attaining its present aspect, with a segmental apse, in the 11th century. The interior contains a 12th-century Cosmatesque and mosaic inlaid stone pavement, and frescoes in the apse by Vitale da Bologna and his assistants; and there are also paintings in the refectory by a Riminese master. The chapter hall has early 14th-century frescoes by a pupil of Giotto.

The free-standing campanile (begun in 1063 and completed within several decades), standing at 48 m, is one of the finest surviving belltowers from the Romanesque period, together with the campanile of Abbey of San Mercuriale (75 m), in Forlì.

Notable also is the mid-11th century Palazzo della Ragione facing the abbey church in the forecourt or atrium'' that was built before the abbey church was consecrated in 1026, by an architect trained at Ravenna, Mazulo.

References

External links

Pomposa Abbey - Polo Museale dell'Emilia-Romagna

Benedictine monasteries in Italy
Monasteries in Emilia-Romagna
Romanesque architecture in Emilia-Romagna
Christian monasteries established in the 9th century
Churches in the province of Ferrara